Kentaro Yano may refer to:
Kentaro Yano (mathematician) (1912–1993), Japanese mathematician
Kentarō Yano (born 1957), Japanese manga artist